The Life is the third studio album from American R&B singer Ginuwine, released on Epic Records in 2001. The album debuted at number 3 on the Billboard 200 with first-week sales of 152,000 copies sold in the U.S. and was certified Platinum by the RIAA. It also spawned a top 5 hit single on the Billboard Hot 100 with "Differences". The Life was the first Ginuwine LP not to be primarily produced by Timbaland, who only produced one track, "That's How I Get Down". The song "Two Reasons I Cry" is dedicated to the memory of Ginuwine's parents, who both died a year before the album was released.

Critical reception

Entertainment Weeklys Tomika Anderson wrote that on The Life "the R&B stud drops his hardcore playa pretense to reveal a softer, more vulnerable side [...] But it’s when he balances his Romeo routine with a funky club vibe (as on ”That’s How I Get Down,” with Ludacris) that Life gets really good." AllMusic editor William Ruhlmann felt that the songs "mostly range from slow to very slow tempos with such trendy touches as acoustic guitar passages. But all that just serves as a bed for Ginuwine's elastic tenor and his message to the women in his audience. The singer sounds like he's been reading women's magazines and tried to construct a persona that's as appealing as possible [...] The Life looks like another winner for him." Sam Faulkner from NME remarked that "it was always going to be impossible for Ginuwine to burst back in quite the same fashion as he suddenly first appeared riding his pony. But this set absolutely does no harm in consolidating himself as one of R&B’s brightest stars." Rolling Stone critic Arion Berger felt that "The Life is all naughty, disposable high points [...] With all the trendy touches on his third album, lady-killing crooner Ginuwine is aiming for ultramodernity – or maybe taking his eventual obsolescence for granted."

Chart performance
In the United States, The Life debuted at number three on the Billboard 200 with first-week sales of 152,000 copies. It also debuted and peaked at number two on the US Top R&B/Hip-Hop Albums. The album was certified gold by the Recording Industry Association of America (RIAA) on May 4, 2001, and eventually reached platinum on October 5, 2001. By September 2003, The Life had sold 1.38 million copies in the US.

Track listing

Charts

Weekly charts

Year-end charts

Certifications

References

2001 albums
Albums produced by Raphael Saadiq
Albums produced by Timbaland
Ginuwine albums